Paropomala is a genus of slant-faced grasshoppers in the family Acrididae. There are at least three described species in Paropomala.

Species
 Paropomala pallida Bruner, 1904 (pale toothpick grasshopper)
 Paropomala virgata Scudder, 1899 (virgata toothpick grasshopper)
 Paropomala wyomingensis (Thomas, 1871) (Wyoming toothpick grasshopper)

References

Further reading

 
 
 
 
 
 

Acrididae